Cover & Flood is the second album by Dublin singer and musician, Katie Kim. It was released on 1 March 2012 via Bandcamp, in April 2012 in Ireland, and in April 2013 in UK/Europe through Flaming June Records.

Cover & Flood was partially recorded at the artist's home and partially recorded in Granny Studios, a former residential home that Kim, John Haggis and other musicians based in Waterford helped to build and turn into a still-functioning recording studio in Waterford City, Ireland.

Cover & Flood was released on double vinyl, CD and via digital download.

Track listing
All songs written by Katie Kim, except where noted.

Side A
"Birds Fly low" – 1.40
"Charlie" – 3.12
"The Feast" – 2.24
"Sugar" – 0.51 Katie Kim, Ray Kehoe
"Pause" – 3.55

Side B
"All Living Things" – 1.34
"Heavy Lighting" – 3.51
"Caught in a Sling" – 1.20
"Blood Bean" – 3.39
"Dimmer" – 3.09
"Fake Your Death" – 2.21

Side C
"Jennifer Mache" – 0.56
"Your Mountains" – 4.06
"Rabbit Paw" – 0.56 Katie Kim, Ray Kehoe
"Science of Sleep" – 1.35

Side D
"Last Waltz" – 1.34
"Little Dragon" – 3.10 Katie Kim, John Murphy
"Wires" – 1.18
"Red Flags" – 3.20
"Habits" – 3.06

Personnel
 Katie Kim – vocals, guitar, piano, drums, bass 
 Aisling Browne – voice 
 Jess Maderson – cello 
 John "Spud" Murphy – bass manipulation, chimes 
 "Deaf" Joe Harney – clarinet voice 
 Ray Kehoe – guitar, mellotron, bass
 John Haggis – drums, co-producer, recording
 Alex Lennon – mastering

References

External links
BandCamp
Hot Press, Album Review
, Cock & Bull Album Review
 Totally Dublin Album Review

2012 albums